Andreja Pejić (formerly Andrej Pejić, born 28 August 1991) is an Australian model and actress. Since coming out as a trans woman in 2013, she has become one of the most recognisable transgender models in the world.

Early life
Pejić was born in Tuzla, Yugoslavia (now part of Bosnia and Herzegovina), and has one older brother, Igor. Her mother, Jadranka Savić, is a Serb, and her father, Vlado Pejić, is a Bosnian Croat. The couple divorced shortly after Pejić's birth. During the Bosnian War, Pejić and Igor fled to Serbia with their mother and grandmother, settling in a refugee camp near Belgrade. After the refugee camp, the family settled in the Vojska village near Svilajnac.

Following the 1999 NATO bombing of Yugoslavia, Pejić's mother felt unsafe and decided to initiate the process of immigration to Australia. In 2000, the family moved to Melbourne, Victoria, Australia, as political refugees when she was eight years old.

While attending high school at University High, Pejić was described as being "academically brilliant".

Career
Pejić was scouted as a model just before her 17th birthday while working at McDonald's, though she has also said in an interview that she was scouted at a swimming pool while still in high school in Melbourne.

Pejić was initially notable for modelling both masculine and feminine clothing. In the Paris fashion shows of January 2011, Pejić walked both the men's and women's shows for Jean-Paul Gaultier and the men's shows for Marc Jacobs. In May 2011, her magazine cover for the New York-based magazine Dossier Journalin which Pejić, with long blond locks in curlers, is pictured taking off a white shirt was ruled too risqué by US bookstores Barnes & Noble and Borders, which covered the image with an opaque sleeve. Concerns were expressed that customers would read Pejić, who at the time was presenting as gender fluid, as a topless woman.

At the Stylenite in July 2011, Pejić appeared on the catwalk both in masculine and feminine clothes from Michalsky. The following year, she modeled bridal creations by Spanish designer Rosa Clara at Barcelona's Bridal Week 2013.

Pejić ranked number 18 on Models.com's Top 50 Models list in 2011, was named one of Outs Most Compelling People, and was ranked number 98 in FHM magazine's 100 Sexiest Women in the World 2011, an award that was criticised for its hostile tone to transgender individuals, especially transgender women; the magazine referred to Pejić as a "thing", commenting, "Pass the sick bucket." FHM subsequently removed the copy accompanying Pejić's entry and posted an apology.

Pejić has appeared on the covers of international editions of Elle, Marie Claire, Harper's Bazaar, L'Officiel, Fashion and GQ. Andreja has also appeared in editorials for fashion publications including Vogue, Elle, I-D, Dazed and Confused, Love, Allure, Purple and Numéro.

On 6 August 2012, Pejić appeared as a guest judge on Britain & Ireland's Next Top Model. The following year, Pejić appeared alongside Iselin Steiro, Saskia de Brauw, Tilda Swinton and David Bowie in the video for Bowie's 2013 single "The Stars (Are Out Tonight)". In late 2013, she made her acting debut playing Radu the Beautiful in the short-lived Turkish television series Fatih, which is based on the life of Mehmed the Conqueror.

Pejić became the first openly transgender model profiled by Vogue, in its May 2015 issue, and also became the first-ever trans woman to sign a cosmetics contract. In 2016, Pejić was awarded "Best International Female Model" by GQ Portugal and the following year she made history by becoming the first transgender woman to appear on the cover of GQ. Pejić made her major film debut in the 2018 crime thriller film The Girl in the Spider's Web.

Personal life
In late 2013, Pejić underwent sex reassignment surgery. In September 2014, Pejić announced plans on the Kickstarter crowdfunding platform to create a film about her reassignment surgery and life as a woman. Pejić started off with a projected goal of $40,000, ultimately exceeding the target funding goal. Pejić had previously dated Are You the One? cast member Remy Duran.

See also
 List of androgynous people

References

Further reading

External links

 Andreja Pejić at FTape.com
 
 Andreja Pejić at Models.com
 "Andrej Pejic, Androgynous Model, In High Demand" at Huffington Post

1991 births
Australian female models
Australian people of Bosnia and Herzegovina descent
Australian people of Serbian descent
Bosnia and Herzegovina emigrants to Australia
Australian LGBT people
Bosnia and Herzegovina LGBT people
Serbian LGBT people
Transgender female models
LGBT models
LGBT actresses
Transgender actresses
Naturalised citizens of Australia
People educated at University High School, Melbourne
People from Tuzla
Yugoslav Wars refugees
Ford Models models
Living people
Bosnia and Herzegovina people of Croatian descent
Bosnia and Herzegovina people of Serbian descent
21st-century LGBT people